Peter M. Fillerup (September 4, 1953 - August 2016) was an American sculptor. A member of the Church of Jesus Christ of Latter-day Saints, he attended Brigham Young University–Idaho and Brigham Young University in Provo. He was trained by Utah sculptor Avard Fairbanks. He designed a sculpture of Porter Rockwell, who served on the Council of Fifty, as well as lighting fixtures for 20 LDS temples, including the Payson Utah Temple and the Lima Peru Temple. In 1997, he designed the Hilda Erickson Memorial Statue, a public statue in memory of all American pioneers in Grantsville, Utah.

Major Sculptures:
	
 1978	“Buffalo Bill the Showman”	bronze		Buffalo Bill Historical Center Cody, Wyoming and		Buffalo Bill Museum Golden, Colorado 
 	1979	“Porter Rockwell”		bronze		LDS Church Museum Salt Lake City, Utah 
 	1981	“Liver-Eating Johnson”		bronze		Johnson gravesite Cody, Wyoming 
 	1982	“Christus”			marble		Biblical Arts Center Dallas, Texas 
 	1982	“Rough String” 			marble		Century America Orange, California 
 	1984	“Jay hawk”			bronze		University of Kansas Lawrence, Kansas 
 1985	“Scouting- Road to Manhood”		bronze		Philmont Boy Scout Ranch Cimarron, New Mexico 
 1985	“Scouting-Road to Manhood”	 		bronze		Boulder Dam Area Council Las Vegas, Nevada 
 1985	“Scouting-Road to Manhood”		bronze		Central Wyoming Council Casper, Wyoming 
 1986	“Kit Carson”			bronze		Salt Lake County Building Sale Lake City, Utah 
 1987	“Up Front”			bronze		Soldiers and Sailors Home Buffalo, Wyoming 
 1989	“Sower of the Good Seed”	bronze		Christ Church Chicago, Illinois 
 1990	“Fanning a Twister-	Steamboat”		bronze		University of Wyoming Laramie, Wyoming 
 1991	“Restoration of the Aaronic Priesthood”		bronze		LDS Relief Society Bldg. Salt Lake City, Utah 
 1994	“The Swimming Hole”		bronze		Brigham Young Historic Park 
 1994	“The Gardner’s”			bronze		Brigham Young Historic Park  
 1994	“Repairing the Flume”		bronze		Brigham Young Historic Park 
 1994	“The Quarry”			bronze		Brigham Young Historic Park  
 1995	“Pioneer Gardner’s”		bronze		Ramah History Museum 	Ramah, New Mexico 
 1996	“Journey’s End”			bronze		Heber City Park Heber, Utah 
 1996	“Hilda Erickson”		bronze		Grantsville City Hall Grantsville, Utah 
 1997	“Pioneer Family”		bronze		Heber Tabernacle Heber, Utah 
 1998	“Pioneer Family”		bronze		Tooele Public Library Tooele, Utah 
 1999	“Noah’s Ark”			bronze		Thanksgiving Point Lehi, Utah 
 1999	“Chief Washakie”		bronze		LDS Conference Center Salt Lake City, Utah 
 2000	“Miner”				bronze		Park City Museum Park City, Utah 
 2001	“Cael Sanderson”		bronze		Wasatch High School Heber, Utah 
 2002	“Olympic Snowflake”		stainless steel	Olympic Plaza Midway, Utah 
 2003	“Russ McDonald”		bronze		McDonald Field Airport Heber, Utah 
 2004	“Horse Fountain”		bronze		Private Residence Midway, Utah 
 2005	“Bear Crossing”			bronze		Private Residence Jackson Hole, Wyoming 
 2006	“Baden Powell”			bronze		LDS BSA Relations National Jamboree 
 2007	“The Summit”			bronze & steel	City of Ogden Recreation Ogden, Utah 
 2008	“Two Eskimo Boys”		bronze		Sitnasauk Native Corporation Nome, Alaska 
 2008	“Derrick Family”		bronze		Derrick Residence Farmington, Utah 
 2009	“Bud Wright-Park 		bronze		Park City Museum 
 2009	 "City Skier”					Park City, Utah 
 2010	“Hard and Fast All the Way”	bronze		Buffalo Bill Historical Center 	Cody, Wyoming 
 2011	“Hard and Fast All the Way”	bronze		Cabela's Headquarters Sidney, Nebraska 
 2011	“The Sentinel”			bronze		Springville Civic Center Springville, Utah 
 2012	“Hard and Fast All the Way”	 bronze		Redstone 	Park City, Utah 
 2013	“Flight to Manhood”		bronze		Summit Bechtel  National Scout Reserve West Virginia 
							
Selected Commercial and Public Projects: 

 AmBank				Heber, Utah
 Bill's Pub North			Chicago, Illinois
 Camp Cloud Rim Girl Scout Ranch	Park City, Utah
 Central Wyoming Council BSA	Casper, Wyoming
 Great American Restaurants		Manassas and Falls Church, Virginia
 	Heber Valley Railroad Depot		Heber, Utah
 	Key Bank				New York, New York
 Marabou Ranch			Steamboat Springs, Colorado
 Maroon Creek Country Club		Aspen, Colorado
 Maytag Mountain Ranch		Hillside, Colorado
 Montana Grille			Bowling Green, Kentucky
 National Bank of Fremont		Fremont, Indiana
 National Boy Scouts of America	Dallas, Texas
 Pearl Stable Convention Center	San Antonio, Texas 
               Philmont Scout Ranch LDS Chapel	Cimarron, New Mexico
 Pinto Ranch				Houston, Texas
 	Pinto Ranch Retail 	  Las Vegas, Nevada and Dallas, Texas 
               Red Ledges				Heber, Utah
 	Stein Eriksen Lodge			Deer Valley, Utah
 Storm Mountain			Steamboat Springs, Colorado
 The Church of Jesus Christ  of Latter-day-Saint Temples 	Curitiba, Brazil, Dallas, Texas, Manaus, Brazil, Payson, Utah, Tijuana, Mexico and Vancouver, B.C.
 Wyoming Governors Residence	Cheyenne, Wyoming	

Other Projects: 
 Nolan Archibald (Black & Decker/DeWalt Tools) residence, Utah
 Wayne & Nancy Badovinus (Eddie Bauer) residence, Idaho
 Lowell Baier residence, Montana
 Ray & Christine Bingham residence, Utah
 Greg Brown (Cowboys & Indians Magazine) office, Texas
 Neil & Linda Brownstein residence, Utah
 Jay & Tamara Call (Flying J) residence, Montana
 David & Janet Cockrell residence, Wyoming
 Harlan Crowe, Camp Top Ridge, New York
 Tom Cruise residence, Colorado
 Dennis Dodson (Southeast Bell) residence, Montana
 Jeff & Gail Dyke (Dyke Associates) residence, Maine
 Michael D. Eisner (Disney) residence, Colorado
 David & Donna Elmore (E Center) residences, Utah & Montana
 Bandar bin Sultan, Ambasador, residence, Colorado
 Edsel Ford (Ford Motor Company) residence, Maine
 Kem & Caroline Gardner residence, Utah
 Rodney Haws residence, Utah
 Jon Huntsman, Sr. (former CEO Huntsman Chemical) residence, Utah
 Jeffrey Katzenburg (DreamWorks) residence, Colorado
 Neil Kaufman residence, Kentucky
 Dave Kaufman residence, Kentucky
 Robert Lee (Hunting World) residence, Montana
 John & Cindy Lovewell residence, California
 John & Vickie Miller residences, Utah & Montana
 Mount Desert Island Bar Harbour, Maine
 Ann S. O’Leary (Evergreen House Design), New York
 Bill & Jennell Presnell residence, California
 U.S. Ambassador John Price residence, Utah
 Corrine Prewitt (wife of Artist Hal Prewitt) residence, Utah
 July Pyle (Pyle Associates) residence, Colorado
 Sally & Keith Reid residence, Utah
 Dick & Sunny Reinhold (SOS Staffing) residence, Utah
 U.S. Ambassaor Mercer Reynolds residence, Wyoming
 Mitt & Ann Romney residences, New Hampshire &Utah
 Kurt Roney (NuSkin) residences, Utah & Wyoming
 Blake Roney (NuSkin) residence, Utah
 Mitchel Rouse Hawkeye Ranch, Wyoming
 John Schnatter (Papa John's Pizza) residence, Kentucky
 Steve & Shannon Sorensen residence, California
 Bill & Joanne Shiebler (Asset Publishing) residences, Wyoming & Utah
 L.E. Simmons residence, Texas
 Harris Simmons (Zions Bank) residence, Utah
 R. M. Stern (R.M. Stern Architects) residence, New York 
 Glenn & Wendy Stearns residence, Wyoming
 Bruce Talkington (Disney-Winnie the Pooh) residence, Utah
 George & Wanda Tomlin, Tennessee
 Jody Thompson (7-11 Stores) residence, Texas				
 Robert & Heather Urich residence, Utah
 Chad & Wendy Weiss residence, Wyoming
 Paul Allen, Residence, Washington

References

1953 births
2016 deaths
People from Cody, Wyoming
Brigham Young University–Idaho alumni
Brigham Young University alumni
American Latter Day Saint artists
Artists from Wyoming
American male sculptors
19th-century American sculptors
19th-century male artists
20th-century American sculptors
20th-century male artists